Maryland House of Delegates District 35B is one of the 67 districts that compose the Maryland House of Delegates. Along with subdistrict 35A, it makes up the 35th district of the Maryland Senate. District 35B includes parts of Cecil County and Harford County, and is represented by two delegates.

Demographic characteristics
As of the 2020 United States census, the district had a population of 87,260, of whom 67,801 (77.7%) were of voting age. The racial makeup of the district was 75,810 (86.9%) White, 3,087 (3.5%) African American, 174 (0.2%) Native American, 2,024 (2.3%) Asian, 24 (0.0%) Pacific Islander, 970 (1.1%) from some other race, and 5,158 (5.9%) from two or more races. Hispanic or Latino of any race were 2,922 (3.3%) of the population.

The district had 64,272 registered voters as of October 17, 2020, of whom 12,909 (20.1%) were registered as unaffiliated, 33,710 (52.4%) were registered as Republicans, 16,714 (26.0%) were registered as Democrats, and 501 (0.8%) were registered to other parties.

Past Election Results

1986

1990

1994

1998

2002

2006

2010

2014

2018

References

35B